Persepolis Kamyaran F.C.  is an Iranian football club based in Kamyaran, Iran. They currently compete in the 2010-11 Hazfi Cup.

Season-by-Season

The table below chronicles the achievements of Persepolis Ganaveh in various competitions since 2010.

Head coaches
 Ghasem Rostami

References

External links
 Official Website

Football clubs in Iran
Association football clubs established in 2007
2007 establishments in Iran